Ghetto Machine is the twelfth studio album by the Japanese heavy metal band Loudness. It was released in 1997 only in Japan and recorded at the famous Fantasy Studios in Berkeley, California. This was the first album to feature bassist Naoto Shibata. Only the instrumental "Katmandu Fly" was recorded in 1995 at ESP Guitars rehearsal studio.

Track listing
All music by Akira Takasaki. Lyrics by Masaki Yamada, except songs 1,2,3,6 by Yamada and Stephan Galfas and song 4 by Kayla Ritt and Stephan Galfas

"Ghetto Machine" - 4:04
"Slave" - 3:17 
"Evil Ecstasy" - 4:10  
"San Francisco" - 4:10  
"Love and Hate" - 6:41 
"Creatures" - 5:30 
"Katmandu Fly" (instrumental) - 1:14  
"Hypnotized" - 4:44 
"Dead Man Walking" - 4:45
"Jasmine Sky" - 5:47 
"Wonder Man" - 5:54

Personnel
Loudness
Masaki Yamada - vocals
Akira Takasaki - guitars, producer
Naoto Shibata - bass 
Hirotsugu Homma - drums

Production
Daniel McClendon - engineer, mixing
Steve Fontano, Michael Rosen, Galen T. Berens - engineers
George Horn - mastering
George Azuma - supervisor
Masao Nakajima - executive producer

References

1997 albums
Loudness (band) albums